Rosebud is a city in Falls County, Texas, United States. Its population was 1,296 at the 2020 census.

City landmarks
Rosebud is the home of the "Rosebud Christmas tree", a 170-ft-tall artificial tree located at 128 W. Main St. The tree was erected by Bell Falls Milam Electric Co-op in the early 1960s. BFM was then bought out by Heart of Texas Electric Co-op. In December 2013, the facility was purchased by M6 Oilfield Rentals and Mfg, LLC, as a development site and regional distribution center. Owner Kenny Ray Murray has indicated that the tree is a Rosebud city icon and a community tradition that will remain as long as the town itself.

Geography
Rosebud is located in southwestern Falls County at  (31.075209, -96.975581). U.S. Route 77 passes through the center of town as 5th Street, leading north  to Waco and south  to Cameron. Texas State Highway 53 leads west  to Temple, intersecting US 77 just north of Rosebud.

Climate
The climate in this area is characterized by hot, humid summers and generally mild to cool winters. According to the Köppen climate classification system, Rosebud has a humid subtropical climate, Cfa on climate maps.

Demographics

As of the 2020 United States census, there were 1,296 people, 423 households, and 308 families residing in the city.

As of the census of 2000,  1,493 people, 571 households, and 379 families resided in the city. The population density was 1,919.2 people per square mile (739.0/km). The 673 housing units averaged 865.1 per square mile (333.1/km). The racial makeup of the city was 59.14% White, 18.29% African American, 0.13% Native American, 0.07% Asian, 0.27% Pacific Islander, 19.16% from other races, and 2.95% from two or more races. Hispanics or Latinos of any race were 29.74% of the population.

Of the 571 households, 31.7% had children under the age of 18 living with them, 45.4% were married couples living together, 17.0% had a female householder with no husband present, and 33.6% were not families. About 32.0% of all households were made up of individuals, and 20.3% had someone living alone who was 65 years of age or older. The average household size was 2.53 and the average family size was 3.21.

In the city, the population was distributed as 28.8% under the age of 18, 6.6% from 18 to 24, 21.8% from 25 to 44, 20.8% from 45 to 64, and 22.0% who were 65 years of age or older. The median age was 40 years. For every 100 females, there were 90.9 males. For every 100 females age 18 and over, there were 78.1 males.

The median income for a household in the city was $24,063, and for a family was $33,300. Males had a median income of $25,662 versus $18,462 for females. The per capita income for the city was $13,577. About 21.0% of families and 24.5% of the population were below the poverty line, including 30.5% of those under age 18 and 22.7% of those age 65 or over.

Photo gallery

Notable people

 Greg Knox (born 1963), from Rosebud, is an American football coach. He is the running-backs coach and special-teams coordinator at the University of Florida. Knox served as the interim head football coach at Mississippi State University for the final game of the 2017 season, leading the Bulldogs to a win in the 2017 TaxSlayer Bowl
 Kenneth McDuff, the Broomstick Killer, was a serial killer responsible for the deaths of 9 to 14+ people and reshaped the criminal justice system in Texas   
 LaDainian Tomlinson, Hall of Fame running back for the San Diego Chargers and New York Jets
 A. D. Whitfield Jr. (born 1943), is a former American football running back in the National Football League for the Dallas Cowboys and Washington Redskins. He played college football at the University of North Texas

References

External links

 City of Rosebud official website
 Rosebud, Texas from the Handbook of Texas Online

Cities in Falls County, Texas
Cities in Texas